You Only Live Twice is a licensed adventure published by Victory Games in 1984 for the espionage role-playing game  James Bond 007.

Description
The You Only Live Twice boxed set contains a 56-page book of the adventure, a cardstock gamemaster's screen with maps of Japan and the villain's hideout, and an envelope with 8 sheets of player handouts, including imitation photographs, and an article from the Times. The adventure is scaled for four Rookie Agents, and is based on the plot of the movie You Only Live Twice.

Plot summary
MI6 is searching for a Soviet space shuttle containing a deadly virus that has disappeared in the area of the Sea of Japan.

Book contents
The 56-page book is divided into five parts:
 Introduction and Briefing: The team's briefing and equipment provided by Q
 Non-Player Characters: All significant personalities the players will meet
 Places, Events and Encounters: The details of the adventure
 Adventure Information: The consequences of success or failure, as well as possible modifications that can be made to the adventure
 Japanese Society: Background information about Japan.

Publication history
Victory Games, a division of Avalon Hill, acquired the license to create a role-playing game based on the James Bond movie franchise and published James Bond 007 in 1983. The game was supported by many adventures and supplements, including 1984's You Only Live Twice, a boxed set designed by Neil Randall, with artwork by Ted Koller and James Talbot.

Reception
In Issue 24 of Imagine, Nick Davison wrote that the player handouts were "excellent", and the artwork was "of a high standard." He also liked the frequent advice for the gamemaster about how to guide players back to the plotline should they stray. He recommended the boxed set, saying, "This scenario should provide entertainment for numerous role-playing sessions."

Other reviews
Different Worlds #39 (May/June, 1985, p. 29)
Abyss #34 (July, 1985)
The V.I.P. of Gaming Magazine #3 (April/May, 1986, p. 40)

References

James Bond 007 (role-playing game) adventures
Role-playing game supplements introduced in 1984